The Bezalel school was an art movement in Palestine in the late Ottoman and British Mandate periods.  Named for the Bezalel Art School, predecessor of the Bezalel Academy of Art and Design, it has been described as "a fusion of oriental art and Art Nouveau."

History

Although Jewish art in Mandatory Palestine has a history that reaches back to at least the mid-19th century, the commonly held view when the Bezalel Art School was founded generally dismissed earlier works as being of little value. One author wrote that "every historical survey of contemporary Israeli art must begin with Boris Schatz and with the establishment of the Bezalel School." Another commented that "Schatz was first among the pioneers who attempted to create a Jewish Art, indeed a Palestinian Art". Yona Fischer has said that Bezalel is not the beginning of Jewish art and craft in Israel but that it is, considered within the historical context of Zionism, a movement that "divides past and future" of an emerging Israel "searching its own definition".

Style and themes

The Bezalel school artists blended varied strands of surroundings, tradition and innovationin paintings and craft objects that  invoked biblical themes, Islamic design and European traditions in their effort to carve out a distinctive style of Jewish art for the new nation planned in the ancient Jewish homeland.
The works of art created by the group contributed significantly to the creation of a distinctive Israeli national culture.

The founder of the school was Boris Schatz, who left his position as  head of the Royal Academy of Arts in Sofia, Bulgaria, to make aliyah 1906 and established an academy for Jewish arts in Jerusalem.  The artists were Zionist immigrants from Europe and the Middle East, with all the psychological and social upheaval that this implies. The movement developed a distinctive style combining Biblical and Zionist subjects with art nouveau, symbolism  and traditional Persian and Syrian artistry.

The Bezalel School produced decorative art objects in a wide range of materials: silver, leather, wood, brass and fabric. While the artists and designers were European-trained, the craftsmen who executed the works were often members of the Yemenite Jewish community, which had a long tradition of craftsmanship in precious metals, and began to make aliyah about 1880. In Yemen, filigree jewelry making was a respected profession among the Jews, with cultural as well as religious applications. Yemenite Jewish silversmiths worked primarily with silver, creating pieces by hand using traditional methods. Yemenite immigrants wearing colorful traditional costumes were also frequent subjects of Bezalel School artists.

Leading members of the school were Boris Schatz, E. M. Lilien, Ya'akov Stark, Meir Gur-Aryeh, Ze'ev Raban, Jacob Eisenberg, Jacob Steinhardt, Shmuel Ben David, and Hermann Struck.

The artists produced not only paintings and etchings, but objects sold as Judaica and souvenirs. In 1915, The New York Times  praised the “Exquisite examples of filigree work, copper inlay, carving in ivory and in wood,” in a touring exhibit.

In the metalwork Moorish patterns predominated, and the damascene work, in particular, showed both artistic feeling and skill in execution.

See also
Visual arts in Israel

References

Further reading
 Gil Goldfine, “Zeev Raban and the Bezalel style”, The Jerusalem Post, 12-14-2001.
The "Hebrew Style" of Bezalel, 1906-1929 Nurit Shilo Cohen The Journal of Decorative and Propaganda Arts, Vol. 20. (1994), pp. 140–163.
Manor, Dalia, Art in Zion: The Genesis of National Art in Jewish Palestine, published by Routledge Curzon, 2005.
 Diana Muir Appelbaum, "First, Build an Art School", Jewish Ideas Daily, Aug. 1, 2012 Jewish Ideas Daily » Daily Features » First, Build an Art School.

External links
 Bezalel School at The Jewish Museum (New York)
 Dalia Manor, “Biblical Zionism in Bezalel Art,” Israel Studies 6.1 (2001) 55-75

Art movements
Decorative arts
Artist groups and collectives
Art Nouveau
Israeli culture
Israeli art
Bezalel Academy of Arts and Design